The Dash was a device manufactured by Sony that connected using Wi-Fi to the Internet.  It had a touch screen which the user could use to browse information or listen to music.  It was not a portable device since it did not have an internal battery.  It was positioned as a personal internet viewer which could act as an alarm clock, Internet radio, digital photo frame and many other uses. 
It had applications which were downloaded onto the device.  These were the same as those supported by the Chumby device.

History 
Sony announced the Dash at the 2010 Consumer Electronics Show. It was made available for sale in late April 2010. Originally the device was only usable in the United States, with users in other countries being locked out with the message "Error: Missing XAPI Service Mode". On June 25, Sony released a software upgrade allowing Dash to be used in other (if not all) countries, however subsequently restricted international service again in November 2011. The device does not have international power settings, and can only be powered by mains electricity of 120 volts, at 60 Hz.

Sony introduced two updated versions of the Dash hardware in September 2011.  The HID-B7 and HID-B70 refreshed the hardware, with the HID-B70 adding a battery backup.  This revision of the Dash device removed Netflix and YouTube streaming support.

On March 14, 2015 the Sony Dash stopped supporting all streaming content, including Netflix, Pandora, Slacker, and YouTube, although the device continued to authenticate with Sony and act as an alarm clock. While there has been no public response from the company, such service returned on April 24, 2015.

As of March 2016, Sony continued to provide limited support for the Dash, such as promised fixes for a leap year issue and a firmware update to address a problem with the control panel.

In April 2017, Sony announced that it "will no longer support dash devices and functionality will terminate" as of July 2017.

Chumby.com has initiated a program to try and offer continued support after Sony discontinued service.

Chumby.com released their Dash patch on August 6, 2017 to allow Dashes to connect with the Chumby servers.

References

Notes
 Hands-Off With the Sony Dash Touchscreen Frame Wired (magazine)
 CES: Will Sony work well with others? EETimes
 Meet the Sony Dash: The Latest Tablet to Debut at CES Network World

External links 
 Dash product home page
 Dash FAQ

Sony products
Internet audio players
Computer-related introductions in 2010